John Henry Esquirol (May 18, 1900 – December 31, 1970) was the ninth bishop of the Episcopal Diocese of Connecticut.

Early life and education
Esquirol was born in Brooklyn, New York on May 18, 1900, the son of Joseph Henry Esquirol and Grace Ella Alfred. He studied at New York University where he graduated with a Bachelor of Science in 1920. He furthered his studies in the Law School of the same university and earned the Doctor of Jurisprudence in 1923, after which he practiced law in Brooklyn for thirteen years. He then studied theology at the General Theological Seminary from where he graduated in 1936. He was awarded the degree of Doctor of Sacred Theology from Berkeley Divinity School.

Priest
Esquirol was ordained deacon in 1936 and priest a year later, both by the Bishop of Long Island, Ernest M. Stires. He served as curate at St Gabriel's Church in Hollis, Queens, New York from 1936 to 1937. He also was the assistant to the Dean of the Cathedral of the Incarnation in Garden City, New York from 1937 to 1939. In 1939 he became the rector of Trinity Church in Southport, Connecticut where he remained until 1956 when he was appointed Dean of Christ Church Cathedral in Hartford, Connecticut.

Bishop
Esquirol was elected as Suffragan Bishop of Connecticut on January 10, 1958. He was consecrated on April 9, 1958, by Presiding Bishop Henry Knox Sherrill in Christ Church Cathedral in Hartford, Connecticut. He was elected Coadjutor Bishop in May 1968. He succeeded as diocesan bishop in May 1969 upon the retirement of Bishop Walter H. Gray During his episcopacy he was vocal in combating racism and advocating the need to listen to young people. Bishop Esquirol died shortly after his accession on December 31, 1970, after a long illness. He was buried at Oak Lawn Cemetery in Fairfield.

Personal life
On April 28, 1927, he was married to Margaret Louise Joost and together had two sons.

References

1900 births
1970 deaths
Episcopal Church in Connecticut
20th-century American Episcopalians
Episcopal bishops of Connecticut
20th-century American clergy